The 1926 New Year Honours in New Zealand were appointments by King George V on the advice of the New Zealand government to various orders and honours to reward and highlight good works by New Zealanders. The awards celebrated the passing of 1925 and the beginning of 1926, and were announced on 1 January 1926.

The recipients of honours are displayed here as they were styled before their new honour.

Privy Councillor
 Major the Honourable Joseph Gordon Coates  – prime minister.
 The Honourable Sir Francis Henry Dillon Bell  – attorney-general, minister of external affairs, and leader of the Legislative Council.

Knight Bachelor
 Henry Brett – of Auckland; formerly mayor of that city. In recognition of his public services.
 Henry Francis Wigram – of Christchurch; formerly member of the Legislative Council and mayor of Christchurch. In recognition of his public services.

Order of Saint Michael and Saint George

Knight Grand Cross (GCMG)
 Colonel the Honourable Sir James Allen  – high commissioner in London for New Zealand.

Companion (CMG)
 Frederick William Furkert  – engineer-in-chief and under-secretary of the Public Works Department.

References

New Year Honours
1926 awards
1926 in New Zealand
New Zealand awards